{{DISPLAYTITLE:2012 LZ1}}

It passed within 5.4 million kilometers (14 lunar distances) of Earth on 14 June 2012. It was discovered during the night of 10–11 June 2012 by astronomer Robert H. McNaught and his colleagues using the 0.5-meter Uppsala Southern Schmidt Telescope at the Siding Spring Observatory in Australia, just four days before its closest approach to Earth.

Overview

A small change of trajectory caused by Earth's gravity was predicted from the 2012 passby.  The Slooh Space Camera streamed live footage of the passby over the Internet.  McNaught and Astronomy magazine columnist Bob Berman hosted the broadcast.  "We love it when stuff like this happens, because it's fun to do and the public appreciates it", said Slooh president Patrick Paolucci.  The asteroid was the same brightness as a 13th-magnitude star, too faint to be seen by the naked eye or a low-end telescope.

See also
2005 YU55, a near-Earth asteroid roughly half the size.
Near-Earth Asteroid Tracking

References

External links 
 
 
 

Minor planet object articles (unnumbered)
Discoveries by Robert H. McNaught

20120614
20120610